Robert Mirosavic (born February 6, 1995) is a Swedish footballer.

Career
Mirosavic moved to the academy of Benfica from Helsingborgs IF in 2012. He returned to Sweden with his hometown team Ängelholms FF in 2014, before a short spell with Högaborgs BK in 2016.

Mirosavic was signed by United Soccer League side Swope Park Rangers on 20 February 2017. He was released by the club at the end of their 2017 season.

Mirosavic was signed by Höganäs BK on 15 March 2018.

References

1995 births
Living people
Swedish footballers
Swedish expatriate footballers
Ängelholms FF players
Högaborgs BK players
Sporting Kansas City II players
Association football midfielders
USL Championship players
Sweden youth international footballers
People from Ängelholm Municipality
Footballers from Skåne County